Seymour Smith Park is an urban park located at 68th and Harrison Streets in Omaha, Nebraska.

Facilities
The park has recreational athletic facilities including a baseball field, football pitches, disc golf, tennis courts, soccer fields and a recreational skate park.  The baseball field hosts American Legion Baseball and the UNO Mavericks.  It also features a soap box derby track and a skeet shooting range.

The park is located on the Big Papio Trail.

Renovation and expansion is expected in 2020 to the skate park.

History
The park dates back to the 1960s.  The disc golf course was built in 1994. Seymour Smith Park hosted the first six NCAA Women's College World Series championships from 1982-1987.

References

Parks in Omaha, Nebraska
1960s establishments in Nebraska